Events from the year 1708 in Sweden

Incumbents
 Monarch – Charles XII

Events

 4 July – Swedish victory over Russia at the Battle of Holowczyn.
 
 
  
 
 
 The Uppsala University Hospital is founded.

Births

 
 

 
 
 29 August – Olof von Dalin, poet (died 1763)
 - Sven Rosén (Pietist), Radical-Pietistic writer and leader (died 1751)

Deaths

 –  Görwel Gyllenstierna, female duelist (born 1646)
 –  Johanna Eleonora De la Gardie, poet (born 1661)
 –  Maria Jonae Palmgren, scholar, one of the first female college students (born 1630)  
 11 November – Hedvig Sophia of Sweden, princess (born 1681)
 –  Anna Maria Clodt, courtier

References

External links

 
Years of the 18th century in Sweden
Sweden